The UNIVAC Athena computer calculated ground commands to transmit to the HGM-25A Titan I intercontinental ballistic missile (ICBM) as part of Western Electric's missile guidance system. The Athena was the "first transistorized digital computer to be produced in numbers." Athena, consisting of ten cabinets plus console on a 13.5 by 20 foot (4.1 by 6 m) floor plan. It used radar tracking of the missile to compute Titan flight data to the necessary burn-out point to start a ballistic trajectory toward the target. On-board Titan attitude control rolled the missile to maintain the missile antenna aligned to the ground antenna. Computer commands were transmitted to the missile from a ground transmitter a "quarter mile out".

Design and history 
The Athena used a Harvard architecture design with separate data and instruction memories by Seymour Cray at Sperry Rand Corporation and cost about $1,800,000.  Used with the computer were the:
AN/GSK-1 Computer Set Console (OA-2654)
Friden, Inc. terminal with paper tape equipment
"massive motor-generator set with 440 volt 3 phase AC input [that] weighed over 2 tons" at remote locations
input from one of two large AN/GRW-5 Western Electric radars in silos each with "20 foot (6 m) tall antenna" raised prior to launch and locked to the raised Titan's "missileborne antenna".
The "battleshort" mode ("melt-before-fail") prevented fail-safe circuits such as fuses from deactivating the machine e.g., during a missile launch. The last Athena-controlled launch was a Thor-Agena missile launched in 1972 from Vandenberg Air Force Base in California, the last of over 400 missile flights using the Athena. The 26 Athena computers, when declared surplus by the federal government, went to various United States universities. The one at Carnegie was used as an undergraduate project until 1971, when the former electrical engineering undergraduate students (Athena Systems Development Group) orchestrated its donation to the Smithsonian Institution.

References

Aerial warfare ground equipment
Cold War military computer systems of the United States
Equipment of Strategic Air Command
UNIVAC mainframe computers
Guidance computers